The third series of Love Island began on 5 June 2017 hosted by Caroline Flack on ITV2. The series concluded on 24 July 2017. It is the third from the current revived series, but fifth overall. The series was narrated by Iain Stirling. As well as the series airing every night of the week with the Saturday episode being used as a weekly catch-up entitled Love Island: The Weekly Hot List, a new spin-off was confirmed, Love Island: Aftersun hosted by Caroline Flack with a studio audience and celebrity guests on Sunday nights after the main show. During the final Aftersun episode of the series, which was presented live from outside the villa, it was announced that there would be a one-off reunion special airing on 30 July 2017 which included all of the Islanders from the series.

On 28 June 2017, it was confirmed that a second villa would be introduced to the show for the first time ever in a twist designed to put the couples to the ultimate test. Eleven new Islanders were introduced during this twist. Mike Thalassitis and Sam Gowland became the first Islanders to return to the villa having been dumped from the island, after being voted back in by the public.

On 24 July 2017, the series was won by Amber Davies and Kem Cetinay, with Camilla Thurlow and Jamie Jewitt as runners-up. The average viewers for this series was 2.52 million, up 1.05 million on the previous series.

Shortly after the final, islanders Chris Hughes and Kem Cetinay released their debut single "Little Bit Leave It". In 2018, Kem went onto participate in the tenth series of Dancing on Ice, whilst Jonny Mitchell took part in the twenty-first series of Celebrity Big Brother. It was also announced that Mike would be joining the cast of Celebs Go Dating, and that Chyna Ellis had signed up for Ibiza Weekender. Sam Gowland also joined Geordie Shore from the sixteenth series. In August 2018, Gabby Allen took part in the twenty-second series of Celebrity Big Brother, Montana Brown joins Celebrity Island with Bear Grylls, Olivia Attwood heads around Celebs Go Dating. In 2019, Georgia Harrison and Theo Campbell competed on the 33rd and 34th seasons of MTV's The Challenge whilst Camilla Thurlow joined the first series of Celebrity SAS: Who Dares Wins. In 2020, Gabby competed on the 36th season of MTV's The Challenge.

Production
On Valentine's Day, 14 February 2017, it was confirmed that Love Island would return for a third series due to air later in the year, The first trailer for the new series began airing on 28 April 2017. On 24 May 2017 it was confirmed that the series would begin on 5 June 2017. Pictures of the brand new villa were unveiled on 2 June 2017. The villa is located in Mallorca.

Islanders
The Islanders for the third series were revealed on 29 May 2017, just a week before the launch. However, throughout the series, more Islanders entered the villa to find love. Some Islanders were dumped from the island for either failing to couple up, some were voted off by their fellow Islanders, and others for receiving the fewest votes in public eliminations. The series was won by Amber Davies and Kem Cetinay on 24 July 2017.

 : Dumped Islanders Mike and Sam both re-entered the villa after being voted back in by the public.

Coupling
The couples were chosen shortly after the contestants entered the villa. After all of the girls entered, the boys were asked to choose a girl to pair up with. Marcel was paired with Olivia, Dom with Montana, Sam and Camilla paired up, Amber and Harley coupled up, whilst Chloë paired up with Kem, and Jessica remained single and was told she would be stealing one of the boys the following day. However, throughout the series the couples swapped and changed.

Notes

 : Jessica arrived after the coupling on Day 1, but was told she would be able to steal a boy for herself on Day 2. She chose Dom.
 : As Jessica already coupled up with Dom earlier in the week, they were automatically coupled up during this re-coupling.
 : As new Islanders, Simon and Tyla could not couple up during this re-coupling.
 : Original Islanders were only given the option to remain in their current couple, or re-couple with one of the new Islanders. As the only single original, Tyla was not given an option and remained single.

Casa Amor
On 28 June 2017, it was confirmed that a second villa would be introduced to the show for the first time ever in a twist designed to put the couples to the ultimate test. Eleven new Islanders were introduced during this twist. The villa was called "Casa Amor" which translates to Love House, and is located not far from the main villa. The new Islanders for the twist included five girls; Amelia, Chyna, Danielle, Ellisha-Jade and Shannen, as well as six boys; Alex, Craig, Marino, Nathan, Rob and Steve.

On Day 26, the boys in the villa (Chris, Dom, Jonny, Kem and Marcel) were told that they would be briefly leaving the villa for a day out. They were then sent to Casa Amor where they discovered they would be staying there for the next few days. Back in the main villa, the girls (Amber, Camilla, Gabby, Montana, Olivia and Tyla) had to pack the boy's belongings before they were joined by Caroline Flack who revealed the twist to them. Shortly afterwards the girls were joined by the new male Islanders, and the boys in Casa Amor were welcomed by the new female Islanders. That night the Islanders from each villa went head-to-head with each other in a game of sexy charades.
On Day 27, the Islanders in the main villa and Casa Amor once again went head-to-head with each other once again in another challenge. This time each team had to complete and number of challenges in the fastest time possible. The team who completed it the quickest earned a point, and at the end of the round the villa with the most points were rewarded with a party.
On Day 28, the original Islanders were told that they would be re-coupling. They were only given the option to remain in their current couple or to choose one of the new Islanders. However, as the boys and the girls were living in separate villas, they weren't aware of what the other one chose. If one decided to re-couple and the other did not, then the one that did not would be dumped from the island. If both re-coupled then they would both remain in the villa with their new partner, or if they both remained then any remaining single Islanders would be eliminated. Olivia and Chris, and Gabby and Marcel both stayed loyal, whereas Amber and Kem both decided to re-couple with Nathan and Chyna respectively. Camilla and Jonny also decided to re-couple, choosing Craig and Danielle. Elsewhere Montana decided to re-couple with Alex, but Dom stayed loyal and therefore was dumped from the Island. As new Islanders Amelia, Ellisha-Jade, Marino, Rob, Shannen and Steve stayed single, they were eliminated.

Weekly summary
The main events in the Love Island villa are summarised in the table below.

Ratings
Official ratings are taken from BARB and include ITV2 +1. Because the Saturday episodes are weekly catch-up episodes rather than nightly highlights, these are not included in the overall averages.

 The reunion episode that aired on 30 July 2017 had 2.12m viewers.

References

2017 British television seasons
Love Island (2015 TV series)